Oriental Oil Kish is operated by Khatam al-Anbia in Iran and partially owned by former Iranian President Hashemi Rafsanjani. In 2005, together with Halliburton, it shared a $310 million contract to develop sectors 9 and 10 of the South Pars oil and gas field. It is blacklisted by the United States Department of the Treasury, the United Nations, and the European Union.

References

Oil and gas companies of Iran
Halliburton
Iranian entities subject to the U.S. Department of the Treasury sanctions